Gurnee Mills is a shopping mall and outlet mall in Gurnee, Illinois, within the Chicago metropolitan area and it is one of the tourist destinations in Chicago, Illinois. Like the nearby Six Flags Great America and Great Wolf Lodge, the mall's placement in Gurnee is intended to bring customers from Chicago, Illinois. With  of gross leasable area and ten major anchor stores in its Z-shaped single-story building, it is the third largest mall in Illinois, and the largest of the four enclosed shopping centers in Lake County. Owned and operated by the Simon Property Group, it was an early part of the "Landmark Mills" chain of shopping malls built by the Mills Corporation. The mall features Hobby Lobby, Macy's, Kohl's, Marshalls, Value City Furniture, Bass Pro Shops Outdoor World, Off Broadway Shoe Warehouse, Bed Bath & Beyond (closing), Forever 21, H&M, Dick's Sporting Goods, Marcus Theatres, Rainforest Cafe, Top Shelf Ice Arena, The RoomPlace, Lee Wrangler Clearance Center, Burlington Coat Factory, Rink Side, Buy Buy Baby and Floor & Decor as its anchor tenants.

Once marketed as the "world's largest outlet mall", Gurnee Mills features a variety of manufacturer's outlets in addition to the more typical mall retailers, and like other nearby outlet malls it is a popular attraction for tourists visiting the Chicago area, with thousands of tour buses making stops at the mall each year. The mall draws more than 20 million visitors each year.

History

Development
The land where Gurnee Mills stands today was plotted out as part of Section 16 of Warren Township, and most of it was owned by the prominent Lamb family from 1837 until sold to the mall's developers in 1988. The corner of Grand Avenue and Hunt Club Road was long known as Lamb's Corners, where various members of the family farmed and operated a long succession of small businesses. When the latest generation of the family sold the land to be developed, they had some conditions, primarily that the oldest trees on the property be preserved and the wetlands along the highway be kept intact.

The Western Development Corporation first announced its plans to build a super-regional shopping center in Lake County, Illinois in 1988. The plan was to annex 324 acres of unincorporated land near the intersection of the Tri-State Tollway and Grand Avenue, on which the mall would be built, into the village of Gurnee. "Gurnee Mills" would become the fourth mall in Western Development's "Landmark Mills" chain, after Potomac Mills, which opened in 1985, and Philadelphia Mills and Sawgrass Mills, which were under construction at the time. Western Development later renamed itself the Mills Corporation after its malls. Local residents were concerned that the mall would steal customers from small local businesses and existing malls like Waukegan's nearby Lakehurst Mall and the Pleasant Prairie Premium Outlets, while Western Development was worried that Gurnee was too small to handle the construction project, despite the success of Six Flags Great America down the road.

Construction on the mall, which was projected to cost $160 million, began with a groundbreaking ceremony on July 19, 1989. By this time, plans had been expanded and the construction site consisted of 422 acres of farm fields and wetlands. At the ceremony, four anchor retailers were announced: Sears Outlet, Reading China and Glass, Phar-Mor, and the Gurnee Mills Family Entertainment Center, a children's amusement area modeled after the 49th Street Galleria in Salt Lake City. A total of 1.6 million hours of work went into the construction process, which took 25 months.

Mills Corporation (1991–2007)

The Gurnee Mills concourse opened to the public at 8 a.m. on August 8, 1991, allowing 70,000 visitors to see the place before stores opened at 10 a.m. The mall's architecture and design was themed after "the agrarian heartland", a look inspired by its rural setting and taking after a wide variety of sources, from the Googie-style diners of the 1950s to Frank Lloyd Wright's Prairie School architecture. An eighth anchor, Filene's Basement, opened in October.

With about 200 retail spaces and two separate food courts: the Dine-O-Rama and the Lake County Fare Food Court, Gurnee Mills was intended from the beginning as a state-of-the-art mall, with high-tech features like a television studio where mall-specific commercials could be produced and shown on the mall's 55 monitors, and its  "video wall". The Family Entertainment Center featured a video arcade and other attractions for children. These features were intended to help turn the mall into a center for entertainment, not just for shopping, as the Mills Corporation felt entertainment was the future for shopping malls. One marketing study found Gurnee Mills was so large that many shoppers preferred to drive to the other side of the parking lot rather than walk to the other end of the mall.

Advertised as the "world's largest outlet mall", Gurnee Mills faced confusion from local consumers over the fact that it featured full-price stores as well as discount outlets, and the first six months of profits were lower than Western Development and the Gurnee tax base were hoping. Some retailers were satisfied with the mall's financial performance, while others were disappointed but optimistic. Phar-Mor, on the other hand, closed its store after one year of disappointing sales, becoming the first anchor to leave. Additions to the mall continued in 1993, with a new retail space constructed for Burlington Coat Factory, as well as Foot Locker, Syms, and The Clearinghouse by Saks Fifth Avenue opening that fall. Circuit City opened in the area around the mall on November 24, and a ten-screen movie theater, one of Marcus Theatres' first Illinois locations, opened at the mall on December 10. The same year, Sears closed its chain of catalog outlet stores, leaving a space which was filled by a Macy's Close-Out store and later by JCPenney. The vacant space left by Phar-Mor was finally filled by Value City in 1995. Also in 1995, Sam's Club and Walmart, which later became Supercenter, opened across the street from the mall on the northwest corner of Hunt Club and Grand Ave.

By 1995, Gurnee Mills was the second-most popular tourist attraction in Illinois, behind the rival Woodfield Mall, drawing 14.4 million visitors and 2,300 tour buses in a year. Capitalizing on this growth and the idea of the mall as a regional entertainment destination, major new developments began to be added to Gurnee Mills, beginning with the Rainforest Cafe in 1996. The Mills Corporation announced its plans to invest $50 million into expanding the mall in 1997, beginning with the July opening of a Planet Hollywood restaurant, the second location in Illinois. Another major addition was the Bass Pro Shops Outdoor World, second in a chain of heavily themed outdoor recreation destination superstores, in November 1997. The former location of Filene's Basement was combined with other spaces to create the new  anchor store, the mall's largest retail space, which previously was intended to hold an Incredible Universe store before plans fell through in 1996.

The focus on entertainment and experiences over shopping continued through the late 1990s, as the dot-com boom threatened to cut into the profits of traditional retailers. Serpent Safari, the first reptile zoo and store to be located in a shopping mall, opened next to the Rainforest Cafe in January 1999, and in August Rink Side Sports, an entertainment center centered around an NHL-size ice rink, was added to the existing arcade and children's play area. These efforts were heralded as a success: 21 million people visited the mall in 1998, representing a growth of 30% in the past three years.

Waukegan's nearby Lakehurst Mall, one of Gurnee Mills' primary competitors, closed in 2001 after the few remaining tenants pulled out, and after declining in the shadow of the much larger mall for a decade. The closure of Lakehurst was one of the main concerns among local residents when Gurnee Mills was originally proposed, and all of their concerns had been proven true by the gradual exodus of its retailers. Lakehurst was also suffering from the early 2000s recession, which affected Gurnee Mills as well: the mall lost two of its major anchors, with Syms leaving and Waccamaw furniture going out of business in 2001, and Spiegel closing its retail chain entirely in 2002. Two of these vacant spaces were filled fairly quickly, with Kohl's lined up to replace Spiegel before the latter even closed, and Circuit City, previously located in a separate building outside the mall, moving in to replace Syms.

Gurnee Town Center, another shopping center next to the Grand Hunt Center going west on Grand Ave, was built in 2002. As of 2021, It has DSW Shoe Warehouse, Old Navy, Ross Dress for Less, and Binny’s Beverage Depot along with a host of other stores. In 2009, Linens N Things closed all locations, followed by Borders in 2011. There was once an hhgregg that closed in 2017. Pier 1 Imports closed in 2019, followed by Art Van Furniture in 2020. 

A decade after closing its outlet store in the mall, Sears returned to Gurnee Mills with a  Sears Grand hypermarket store in 2004, replacing and expanding the vacant space formerly home to Waccamaw Pottery. On its opening, Sears Grand became the largest store at Gurnee Mills, and it was the second of its kind after the store in Jordan Landing in West Jordan, Utah. Unlike most Sears Grand locations, the store in Gurnee was directly attached to a shopping mall, and after the Sears Grand at Pittsburgh Mills closed in 2015, it became the only mall-attached Sears Grand location until its own closure in 2018. The introduction of new full-price department stores like Sears and Kohl's represented the beginning of the mall's "third life", as retail analysts described it, following its period as an outlet mall and as an entertainment center.

The focus on supplementing shopping with entertainment did not end there, however. In 2005, a Wannado City theme park was planned for the mall. The Wannado company already had a partnership with the Mills Corporation, having its first location at Sawgrass Mills and another planned for Mills' 108 North State Street development in Chicago. Plans continued to be developed through 2007, but both companies faced financial downturns and the project was never realized. Nike opened in May 2006.

Simon Property Group (2007–present)
The Mills Corporation faced bankruptcy in 2006 after the Securities & Exchange Commission found that management had made $350 million in accounting errors during the previous four years. All existing Mills malls were sold to the Simon Property Group in 2007, making Gurnee Mills one of over 300 Simon properties around the world. From early on in the mall's new ownership, Simon expressed discontentment with the aging decor of the mall, particularly the agricultural theming, which had not been updated since the mall's opening in 1991. After weathering the financial downturn, Simon announced its plans for a major $5 million renovation of the mall in 2010, updating the style and the facilities of the mall to make it more "sophisticated."

Neiman Marcus opened a Clearance Center in 2009. That same year, JCPenney closed its Clearance Center. Meanwhile, Gurnee Mills announced in 2011 that it would demolish the vacant former Circuit City location entirely and construct an entirely new building for a Macy's department store at one end of the building, and remodel an area between Kohl's and Value City Furniture to create a "full price wing." The mall promised that these new developments would turn it into the "first true hybrid center" and change its "personality." The new stores opened on July 24, 2013 in time for the mall's 22nd anniversary, with the promise of other retailers following Macy's path, and "positioning Gurnee Mills for another 20 years of relevance". The upgrades mirrored those being done by Simon at the dozens of other Mills malls, as part of a nationwide strategy to remake them into "timeless" shopping centers.  Bed Bath & Beyond and Buy Buy Baby opened a combined store in 2012.

Floor & Decor opened on January 14, 2017, replacing Shoppers World. Another round of renovations, with a budget of $6 million, began in September 2017. A new theme is planned for the Dine-O-Rama food court. The Rink Side Sports ice rink had been closed since April 15, after a series of "catastrophic" equipment failures, but a plan to reopen the rink under the new management of the Tilt Studio video arcade was announced in October. Dick's Sporting Goods opened at Gurnee Mills in April 2018 in the former The Sports Authority, a plan which was inadvertently revealed early by a Gurnee village trustee.

On May 31, 2018, it was announced that Sears Grand would be closing as part of a plan to close 72 stores nationwide. The store closed on September 2, 2018 and it was replaced by Hobby Lobby in January 28, 2022. Tilt Studio was closed in 2020 and was replaced by Top Shelf Ice Arena, which opened in 2021.

On September 15, 2022, it was announced that Bed Bath & Beyond would be closing as part of a plan to close 150 stores nationwide.

Bus route 
Pace

565 Grand Avenue

See also
 Six Flags Great America
 Great Wolf Lodge

References

External links 
 Gurnee Mills

Shopping malls in Lake County, Illinois
Shopping malls established in 1991
1991 establishments in Illinois
Outlet malls in the United States
Gurnee, Illinois
Simon Property Group